"Comfortable" is a song by American rapper K Camp for his debut studio album Only Way Is Up. It was released on June 9, 2015 as the album's second single.  "Comfortable" has since peaked at number 54 on the Billboard Hot 100. The official remix features Akon and 50 Cent.

Commercial performance 
In the United States, "Comfortable" peaked at number 54 on the Billboard Hot 100 on the issue dated September 26, 2015.

Music video 

The song's music video features K Camp at Punta Cana, Dominican Republic. In the video, K Camp is shown with his love interest,  with a Handycam to capture their vacation moments.

Charts

Certifications

References 

2015 singles
2015 songs
K Camp songs
Interscope Records singles